The Twentieth Century Motor Car Corporation was an American automobile company started by Geraldine Elizabeth "Liz" Carmichael, in 1974, incorporated in Nevada. The company's flagship vehicle was the Dale, a prototype three-wheeled two-seater automobile designed and built by Dale Clifft. It was touted as being powered by an 850 cc air-cooled engine and featuring  fuel economy and a $2,000 price (roughly ), which were popular specifications during the mid 1970s US fuel crisis.

The company would ultimately prove to be fraudulent when Carmichael went into hiding with investors' money.

Vehicles

The Dale

Before meeting Geraldine Elizabeth "Liz" Carmichael, Dale Clifft hand-built a car made of tubing and covered in red metal flake Naugahyde. It was powered by a 305cc Honda Super Hawk motorcycle that was welded into the metal frame. The Dale prototype was designed and built by Clifft, and the project was subsequently marketed by Carmichael. Much of the interest in the Dale was a result of the 1973 oil crisis: fuel-economy automobiles like the Dale were viewed as a solution to the oil crunch. Speaking to the Chicago Sun-Times in November 1974, Carmichael said that she "was on the way to taking on General Motors or any other car manufacturer for that matter". She also claimed that she had millions of dollars in backing "from private parties" and also talked of a  corporate office in Encino, California. The prototypes were built in Canoga Park, and an aircraft hangar in Burbank was supposedly leased for the assembly plant, with more than 100 employees on the payroll.

The Dale was also marketed as being high-tech, lightweight, yet safer than any existing car at the time. "By eliminating a wheel in the rear, we saved 300 pounds and knocked more than $300 from the car's price. The Dale is 190 inches long, 51 inches high and weighs less than 1,000 pounds," Carmichael claimed. She maintained that the car's lightness did not affect its stability or safety. The low center of gravity always remained inside the triangle of the three wheels, making it nearly impossible for it to tip over. Carmichael claimed the Dale was powered by a thoroughly overhauled BMW two-cylinder motorcycle engine, which generated  and would allow the car to reach . She expected sales of 88,000 cars in the first year and 250,000 in the second year.

A non-functional model of the Dale was displayed at the 1975 Los Angeles Auto Show. The car was also shown on the television game show The Price Is Right as a prize.

Other vehicles
Two additional vehicles were proposed by Carmichael to complement the Dale: the Revelle and the Vanagen, a station wagon. Both of these featured a three-wheeled design and used the same two-cylinder engine. None of the vehicles were produced, and only three prototype vehicles of the Dale were made. Only one prototype was able to move under its own power.

Fraud
The company had already encountered legal troubles when California's Corporations Department ordered it to stop offering stock for public sale because it had no permit.

Rumors of fraud began to emerge, followed by investigations by a TV reporter and some newspapers. The California Corporation Commission began an investigation as well. Although Clifft said he still believed in the project and said that he was promised $3 million in royalties once the Dale went into production, he only received $1,001, plus a $2,000 check, which bounced. Carmichael went into hiding, and was featured in a 1989 episode of Unsolved Mysteries, which detailed the fraud behind the Dale for which she was a wanted fugitive. She was eventually found working in Dale, Texas, under the alias Katherine Elizabeth Johnson, at a flower shop. She was arrested, extradited to California, tried and sent to prison for eighteen months.

Carmichael died of cancer in 2004. Clifft, who was never shown to have been involved in the fraud, later formed The Dale Development Co. and developed and received several patents before dying in 1981.

HBO documentary
HBO premiered a four-part documentary titled The Lady and the Dale on January 31, 2021. Directors for the series are Nick Cammilleri and Zackary Drucker. The documentary has been described as "... a lot of stories - about fraud, flight, FBI manhunts, transgender politics, selective prosecution, bias in the media, and corruption in the courts."

References

External links
Dale(USA) - More articles about the Dale

Defunct motor vehicle manufacturers of the United States
Three-wheeled motor vehicles
Fraud in the United States